Lei Muk Shue East is one of the 17 constituencies of the Tsuen Wan District Council. It covers the east part of Lei Muk Shue Estate and the rural villages at the west of Wo Yee Hop Road. The seat elects one member of the council every four years. Prior to its creation in 1999, the seat has continuously been held by Sumly Chan Yuen-sum of Civic Party since 1985.

Councillors represented

Election results

2010s

2000s

1990s

References

2011 District Council Election Results (Tsuen Wan)
2007 District Council Election Results (Tsuen Wan)
2003 District Council Election Results (Tsuen Wan)

Constituencies of Hong Kong
1999 establishments in Hong Kong
Constituencies established in 1999
Constituencies of Tsuen Wan District Council
Tsuen Wan